Whiskey Tango Ghosts is the third solo album by Tanya Donelly, released in 2004. The album marks a departure from Donelly's previous pop work in favor of a country and folk-influenced sound. Donelly has described the album as influenced by  "a horrible war, a horrible administration, (and) a bleak, mean winter."

Track listing
All songs by Tanya Donelly, except where noted
"Divine Sweet Divide" – 3:25
"Every Devil" – 3:06
"Whiskey Tango" (Donelly, Dean Fisher) – 3:11
"Just in Case You Quit Me" – 3:27
"Butterfly Thing" (Donelly, Fisher) – 3:21
"My Life as a Ghost" (Donelly, Fisher) – 3:41
"The Center" (Donelly, Fisher) – 3:26
"Golden Mean" – 4:15
"The Promise" – 3:04
"Story High" – 4:20
"Fallout" – 3:28
"Dona Nobis Pacem" (Hidden / Uncredited Track)* – 0:37

"Dona Nobis Pacem" (which translates to "Give Us Peace") is a traditional Latin hymn.

Personnel
Tanya Donelly – guitar, vocals
Dean Fisher – bass, guitar, percussion, drums
Rich Gilbert – guitar, pedal steel
David Narcizo – drums
Elizabeth Steen – piano, vocals, Wurlitzer

Production
Engineers: Matt Beaudoin, Matthew Ellard
Assistant engineer: Matt Tahaney
Mixing: Matthew Ellard
Mastering: Steve Rooke
Photography: Richard Donelly
Cover photo: Chris Hosford
Cover painting: Kristen Hughes

Tanya Donelly albums
2004 albums
4AD albums